The St. Euphrosynia Belarusian Orthodox Church is a Belarusian Greek Orthodox church in South River, New Jersey. The archdiocese is the American Carpatho-Russian Orthodox Diocese of the United States. The head of the church is Rev. Fr. Konstanin Gavrilkin. It is named after Euphrosyne of Polotsk.

History 
After the end of World War II, Belarusian parishioners came together and worshiped in Displaced Person-Camps in Regensburg, Michelsdorf and Backnang, Germany. Some of the church members were able to move to the United States and moved to South River, New Jersey, where already a Belarusian community existed. In 1951 a parish council was elected, with Father Nikolai Lapitzki selected as its first pastor. The parish celebrated their first worship in the second floor of the Conklin Methodist Church, a local church, whose Rev. G. Nelson Moore allowed to use it. The Church Council became a member of the Greek Orthodox Archdiocese of North and South America. In 1953 the parish bought a former Jewish synagogue on Whitehead Avenue and converted it into an Orthodox Christian Church. In addition, the Church acquired a piece of land on Hillside Avenue for use as a parish cemetery.

On a hilltop behind the St. Euphrosynia Belarusian Orthodox Church, a large memorial was installed bearing the official seal of the 
Byelorussian Central Council (Bielaruskaja Centalnaja Rada, or BCC) reads, "glory to those who fought for freedom and independence of Byelorussia." The stone memorial is topped by a large iron cross, which has a small double-barred cross at its center, which represents the Cross of Saint Euphrosyne and is a central element of the medieval Belarusian coat of arms, Pahonia.

Saint Euphrosynia Belarus Orthodox Church Cemetery

Notable burials 
 Radasłaŭ Astroŭski (1887–1976), president of the Belarusian Central Rada and Nazi collaborator
 Jan Stankievič (1891–1976), politician, linguist, historian, Nazi collaborator, and philosopher
Emanuel Jasuik (1906-1977), former Mayor of Stolpce, Poland, CIA informant, and Nazi collaborator

References 

1953 establishments in New Jersey
Belarusian-American history
Churches in Middlesex County, New Jersey
European American culture in New Jersey
Churches in South River, New Jersey